Phrynocephalus golubewii is a species of agamid lizard endemic to Turkmenistan.

References

golubewii
Endemic fauna of Turkmenistan
Reptiles described in 1990